Gabriel Valentin Plumbuitu (born 14 February 2004) is a Romanian professional footballer who plays as a forward for Liga III club CS Tunari.

References

External links
 
 

2004 births
Living people
Footballers from Bucharest
Romanian footballers
Romania youth international footballers
Association football forwards
Liga I players
Liga II players
Liga III players
ASC Daco-Getica București players
CS Gaz Metan Mediaș players
FC Metaloglobus București players
SSU Politehnica Timișoara players